The One Thirty North Eighth Building is a historic building located at 130 North 8th Street in Quincy, Illinois.

Description and history 
The building was built in 1900 as a photography studio. Prominent Quincy architect Ernest M. Wood designed the building in the Tudor Revival style. The building is representative of Wood's early works, before his style became influenced by Frank Lloyd Wright's work; it can be contrasted with Wood's own office, a Prairie School building of similar size which Wood designed twelve years later. Significant Tudor elements of the building include its half-timbered gable on the second floor, steep gable roof, and decorative interior woodwork.

The building was added to the National Register of Historic Places on February 9, 1984.

References

Commercial buildings on the National Register of Historic Places in Illinois
Tudor Revival architecture in Illinois
Commercial buildings completed in 1900
National Register of Historic Places in Adams County, Illinois
Buildings and structures in Quincy, Illinois